The red-throated barbet (Psilopogon mystacophanos) is a species of bird in the family Megalaimidae.
It is found in Brunei, Indonesia, Malaysia, Myanmar, Singapore, and Thailand.
Its natural habitats are subtropical or tropical moist lowland forest and subtropical or tropical swamps.
It is threatened by habitat loss.

Description 
The red-throated barbet male is mainly green with a red crown, throat, and spot below the throat. He also has a black spot above each eye and a yellow crown patch. There is also some blue near his eyes and on the lower part of his throat. The female lacks most of the male's facial coloration, but is otherwise similar. Juveniles resemble females. Adults measure  in length and weigh .

References

red-throated barbet
Birds of Southeast Asia
Birds of Malaysia
red-throated barbet
Taxonomy articles created by Polbot